The 2009 Ligas Superiores, the fifth division of Peruvian football (soccer), was played by variable number teams by Department. The tournaments were played on a home-and-away round-robin basis. 
The Ligas Superiores was created officially in 2009. For the 2009, they were nine Departmental Confederacies that have determined to adopt them: Arequipa, Ayacucho, Cajamarca, Huánuco, Lambayeque, Pasco, Piura, Puno and Tumbes.

Liga Superior de Arequipa

Liga Superior de Ayacucho

Liga Superior de Cajamarca

Liga Superior de Huánuco

Liga Superior de Lambayeque

Liguilla

Liga Superior de Pasco

Liga Superior de Piura

Liga Superior de Puno

Liga Superior de Tumbes

External links
 Dechalaca.com - Copa Peru 2009
 Ligas Superiores: El Balance

2009
5